"It's All Over" is a song written by Billy Sherrill and Glenn Sutton. It was originally recorded by American country artists David Houston and Tammy Wynette. It was released as a single in 1968.

Background and reception
"It's All Over" was first recorded on June 21, 1967 in the Columbia Recording Studio in Nashville, Tennessee. Additional tracks between the pair were also recorded during this session. The session was produced by Billy Sherrill.

The song reached number 11 on the Billboard Hot Country Singles chart in 1968. It became the pair's second and final major hit as a duet partnership. It was also released on their only studio album together entitled My Elusive Dreams.

Track listings
7" vinyl single
 "It's All Over" 
 "Together We Stand (Divided We Fall)"

Charts

Weekly charts

References 

1968 songs
1968 singles
Epic Records singles
Tammy Wynette songs
David Houston (singer) songs
Song recordings produced by Billy Sherrill
Songs written by Billy Sherrill
Songs written by Glenn Sutton